There are 115 mammal species known to occur in Montana. Among Montana's mammals, three are listed as endangered or threatened and the Montana Department of Fish, Wildlife and Parks lists a number of species as species of concern.

Species are listed by common and scientific names, as per R. S. Hoffman and D. L. Pattie, A Guide to Montana Mammals, 1968.

New World opossums (Order: Didelphimorphia) 
Family: Didelphidae (true opossums)
 Virginia opossum, Didelpis virginiana introduced

Lagomorphs (Order: Lagomorpha) 
Family: Leporidae (rabbits and hares)
 Pygmy rabbit, Brachylagus idahoensis
 Snowshoe hare, Lepus americanus
 Black-tailed jackrabbit, Lepus californicus
 White-tailed jackrabbit, Lepus townsendii
 Desert cottontail, Sylvilagus audubonii
 Eastern cottontail, Sylvilagus floridanus
 Mountain cottontail, Sylvilagus nuttallii

Family: Ochotonidae (pikas)
American pika, Ochotona princeps

Even-toed ungulates (Order: Artiodactyla)

Family: Antilocapridae (pronghorns)
 Pronghorn, Antilocapra americana 

Family: Bovidae (bovids)
 American bison, Bison bison 
 Mountain goat, Oreamnos americanus
 Bighorn sheep, Ovis canadensis  

Family: Cervidae (deer)
 Moose, Alces alces
 Elk, Cervus canadensis
 Caribou, Rangifer tarandus extirpated, vagrant
Boreal woodland caribou, R. t. caribou extirpated, vagrant
 Mule deer, Odocoileus hemionus
 White-tailed deer, Odocoileus virginianius

Carnivorans (Order: Carnivora) 

Family: Ursidae (bears)
 American black bear, Ursus americanus
 Brown bear, Ursus arctos
Grizzly bear, U. a. horribilis

Family: Procyonidae (procyonids)
Raccoon, Procyon lotor

Family: Felidae (cats)
 Canada lynx, Lynx canadensis
 Bobcat, Lynx rufus
 Cougar, Puma concolor

Family: Canidae (canids)
 Coyote, Canis latrans
 Gray wolf, Canis lupus 
Northern Rocky Mountain wolf, C. l. irremotus
Great Plains wolf, C. l. nubilus extinct
Northwestern wolf, C. l. occidentalus introduced
 Gray fox, Urocyon cinereoargentus
 Swift fox, Vulpes velox
 Red fox, Vulpes vulpes

Family: Mustelidae (mustelids)
Wolverine, Gulo gulo
North American river otter, Lontra canadensis
Pacific marten, Martes caurina
Black-footed ferret, Mustela nigripes reintroduced
Least weasel, Mustela nivalis
American ermine, Mustela richardsonii 
Long-tailed weasel, Neogale frenata
American mink, Neogale vison
Fisher, Pekania pennanti
American badger, Taxidea taxus

Family: Mephitidae (skunks)
Striped skunk, Mephitis mephitis
Western spotted skunk, Spilogale gracilis

Bats (Order: Chiroptera) 

Family: Vespertilionidae (vesper bats)

 Pallid bat, Antrozous pallidus
 Townsend's big-eared bat, Corynorhinus townsendii
 Big brown bat, Eptesicus fuscus
 Spotted bat, Euderma maculatum
 Silver-haired bat, Lasionycteris noctivagans
 Eastern red bat, Lasiurus borealis
 Hoary bat, Lasiurus cinereus
 California myotis, Myotis californicus
 Western small-footed myotis, Myotis ciliolabrum
 Long-eared myotis, Myotis evotis
 Little brown bat, Myotis lucifugus
 Northern myotis, Myotis septentrionalis
 Fringed myotis, Myotis thysanodes
 Long-legged bat, Myotis volans

Shrews (Order: Eulipotyphla) 

Family: Soricidae
 Northern short-tailed shrew, Blarina brevicauda
 Arizona shrew, Sorex arcticus
 Cinereus shrew, Sorex cinereus
 Hayden's shrew, Sorex haydeni
 American pygmy shrew, Sorex hoyi
 Merriam's shrew, Sorex merriami
 Montane shrew, Sorex monticolus
 Dwarf shrew, Sorex nanus
 American water shrew, Sorex palustris
 Preble's shrew, Sorex preblei
 Vagrant shrew, Sorex vagrans

Rodents (Order: Rodentia) 
Family: Castoridae (beavers)
North American beaver, Castor canadensis

Family: Sciuridae (squirrels)

 Golden-mantled ground squirrel, Callospermophilus lateralis
 White-tailed prairie dog, Cynomys leucurus
 Black-tailed prairie dog, Cynomys ludovicianus
 Northern flying squirrel, Glaucomys sabrinus
 Thirteen-lined ground squirrel, Ictidomys tridecemlineatus
 Hoary marmot, Marmota caligata
 Yellow-bellied marmot, Marmota flaviventris
 Yellow-pine chipmunk, Neotamias amoenus
 Least chipmunk, Neotamias minimus
 Red-tailed chipmunk, Neotamias ruficaudus
 Uinta chipmunk, Neotamias umbrinus
 Eastern gray squirrel, Sciurus carolinensis introduced
 Eastern fox squirrel, Sciurus niger
 American red squirrel, Tamiasciurus hudsonicus
 Uinta ground squirrel, Urocitellus armatus
 Columbian ground squirrel, Urocitellus columbianus
 Wyoming ground squirrel, Urocitellus elegans
 Richardson's ground squirrel, Urocitellus richardsonii

Family: Heteromyidae (pocket mice and kangaroo rats)

 Hispid pocket mouse, Chaetodipus hispidus
 Ord's kangaroo rat, Dipodomys ordii
 Olive-backed pocket mouse, Perognathus fasciatus
 Great Basin pocket mouse, Perognathus parvus

Family: Geomyidae (pocket gophers)

 Idaho pocket gopher, Thomomys idahoensis
 Northern pocket gopher, Thomomys talpoides

Family: Dipodidae (jumping mice)

 Meadow jumping mouse, Zapus hudsonius
 Western jumping mouse, Zapus princeps

Family: Cricetidae (New World mice and rats, voles, lemmings, muskrats)

 Sagebrush vole, Lemmiscus curtatus
 Long-tailed vole, Microtus longicaudus
 Montane vole, Microtus montanus
 Prairie vole, Microtus ochrogaster
 Meadow vole, Microtus pennsylvanicus
 Water vole, Microtus richardsoni
 Southern red-backed vole, Myodes gapperi
 Bushy-tailed woodrat, Neotoma cinerea
 Muskrat, Ondatra zibethicus
 Northern grasshopper mouse, Onychomys leucogaster
 White-footed mouse, Peromyscus leucopus
 Western deer mouse, Peromyscus sonoriensis
 Heather vole, Phenacomys intermedius
 Western harvest mouse, Reithrodontomys megalotis
 Northern bog lemming, Synaptomys borealis

Family: Muridae (Old World rats and mice)
 House mouse, Mus musculus introduced
 Norway rat, Rattus norvegicus introduced

Family: Echimyidae (spiny rats)
 Nutria, Myocastor coypus introduced

Family: Erethizontidae
 North American porcupine, Erethizon dorsatum''

See also
 Lists of mammals by region
 Amphibians and Reptiles of Montana
 Birds of Montana

Further reading

Notes

Mammals
Montana